Henri De Jaegher (7 November 1893 – 7 October 1970) was a Belgian racing cyclist. He rode in the 1922 Tour de France.

References

1893 births
1970 deaths
Belgian male cyclists